Deng Xiaoping Theory, also known as Dengism, is the series of political and economic ideologies first developed by Chinese leader Deng Xiaoping. The theory does not reject Marxism–Leninism or Maoism, but instead claims to be an adaptation of them to the existing socioeconomic conditions of China.

The theory also played an important role in China's modern economy, as Deng stressed opening China to the outside world, the implementation of one country, two systems, and through the phrase "seek truth from facts", an advocation of political and economic pragmatism.

Synopsis 

Drawing inspiration from Lenin's New Economic Policy, Deng's theory encouraged the construction of socialism within China by having it develop "Chinese characteristics," which was guided by China’s economic reform policy with the goal of self-improvement and the development of a socialist system. His theory did not suggest improvement or development of China's closed economic system, but rather, overthrowing the existing economic system for a more open one.

China largely owes its economic growth to Deng Xiaoping's emphasis on economic production, under the theory of the productive forces – a subset of 20th century Marxist theory. In the view of Deng, the task faced by the leadership of China was twofold: (i) promoting modernization of the Chinese economy, and (ii) preserving the ideological unity of the Chinese Communist Party (CCP) and its control of the difficult reforms required by modernization.

Deng argued that due to the isolation of China in the international order of the time and an extremely underdeveloped economy, in order for China to achieve socialism and to bridge the gap between China and Western capitalism, China would have to borrow certain market elements and aspects of capitalism into its economy. However, he also suggested that its usage would have to be state-controlled. These borrowed principles, in Deng's mind, allowed a more liberal interpretation of China’s modernization into a socialist state. This includes marketing characteristics such as planning, production, and distribution that could be interpreted as socialism. Modernization efforts were generalized by the concept of the Four Modernizations. The Four Modernizations were goals, set forth by Zhou Enlai in 1963, and continued by Hua Guofeng after 1976, to improve agriculture, industry, national defense, and science and technology in China. Dengists still believe that China needs public ownership of land, banks, raw materials, and strategic central industries so a democratically elected government can make decisions on how to use them for the benefit of the country as a whole instead of the land owners, but at the same time, private ownership is allowed and encouraged in industries of finished goods and services. According to the Dengist theory, private owners in those industries are not a bourgeoisie. Because in accordance with Marxist theory, bourgeois owns land and raw materials. In Dengist theory, private company owners are called civil run enterprises.

To preserve ideological unity, Deng Xiaoping Theory formulated "Four Cardinal Principles" which the CCP must uphold:
 the "basic spirit of communism";
 the political system of the PRC, known as the people's democratic dictatorship;
 the leadership of the Communist Party, and;
 Marxism-Leninism and Mao Zedong Thought.

In 1992, fourteen years after Deng had become China's leader, he embarked on a tour of southern China. During this trip he uttered his famous phrase: "Open up". "Open up" would be the foundation for China's economic development up until the present day.

Dengists also take a very strong position against any form of personality cult which appeared in the Soviet Union during Stalin's rule and the current North Korea.

Relation to Maoism 
Little evidence of Mao's approach survived in Deng. Deng Xiaoping Theory argues that upholding Mao Zedong Thought does not mean blindly imitating Mao's actions without deviation as seen in the government of Hua Guofeng, and that doing so would actually "contradict Mao Zedong Thought".

Legacy 
The Deng Xiaoping theory played a crucial role in China reforming from its previous state-owned market economy, which resulted in a rapid increase in economic growth within the country, known as the "Chinese economic miracle".

It has increased the Chinese GDP growth rate to over 8% per year for thirty years and China now has the second largest economy by nominal GDP in the world. Due to the influence of Dengism, Vietnam and Laos have also adopted similar beliefs and policies, allowing Laos to increase its real GDP growth rate to 8.3%. Cuba is also starting to embrace such ideas.

Deng’s theory would be inherited by Jiang Zemin, along with aspects of Mao Zedong Thought and Marxist-Leninism, into a socio-political theory known as the “Three Represents.” This theory was added to the Constitution of the Chinese Communist Party in 2004.

Having served as the CCP's major policy guide since the Third Plenum of the 11th CCP National Congress in 1978, the theory was entrenched into the Communist Party's Constitution as a guiding ideology in 1997, and was also subsequently written into the Constitution of the People's Republic of China:

See also 

 Three Represents
 Scientific Outlook on Development
 Trickle-down economics
 Socialist market economy
 Theory of the productive forces
 Revisionism (Marxism)
 Khrushchevism
 Perestroika
 Xi Jinping Thought
 New Economic Policy

References

Further reading

External links 
Deng Xiaoping's Works (1938–1965) 
Deng Xiaoping's Works (1975–1982) 
Deng Xiaoping's Works (1982–1992) 
On Deng Xiaoping Thought, an English-translated Chinese work from 1996 in PDF format

Ideology of the Chinese Communist Party
Politics of China
Eponymous political ideologies
Deng Xiaoping
Economy of China